Per Söderlund (born 1972) is a Swedish politician.  he serves as Member of the Riksdag representing the constituency of Örebro County. Söderlund worked as a software developer before becoming an MP.  He became a member after Jonas Millard left the Riksdag. 

He was also elected as Member of the Riksdag in September 2022.

References 

Living people
1972 births
Place of birth missing (living people)
21st-century Swedish politicians
Members of the Riksdag 2018–2022
Members of the Riksdag from the Sweden Democrats